Emmanuel-François Canappe (25 July 1849 – 20 September 1907) was a French clergyman and bishop for the Roman Catholic Diocese of Basse-Terre. Canappe was born in Wailly, France. He became ordained in 1872. He was appointed bishop in 1901.

References

French Roman Catholic bishops in North America
1849 births
1907 deaths
People from  Pas-de-Calais
19th-century French Roman Catholic priests
20th-century French Roman Catholic bishops
Roman Catholic bishops of Basse-Terre